Zeylanidium are a genus of flowering plants in the riverweed family Podostemaceae, native to Sri Lanka, India, Myanmar and Thailand. They have caducous leaves and either crustose or ribbonshaped thalli.

Species
Currently accepted species include:

Zeylanidium barberi (Willis) C.Cusset → Possibly Podostemum barberi Willis
Zeylanidium crustaceum M.Kato
Zeylanidium johnsonii (Wight) Engl. (doubtful)
Zeylanidium lichenoides (Kurz) Engl.
Zeylanidium maheshwarii C.J.Mathew & Satheesh
Zeylanidium manasiae R.Krishnan, P.Khanduri & R.Tandon
Zeylanidium olivaceum (Gardner) Engl.
Zeylanidium sessile (Willis) C.D.K.Cook & Rutish.
Zeylanidium subulatum (Gardner) C.Cusset → Possibly Podostemum subulatum Gardner
Zeylanidium tailichenoides M.Kato & Koi

References

Podostemaceae
Malpighiales genera